Hans Jorritsma (born 19 March 1949) is a retired field hockey player from the Netherlands. He competed at the 1976 Olympics and 1978 World Cup, where his teams finished in fourth and second place, respectively. For political reasons Jorritsma refused to receive his World Cup silver medal from the hands of Jorge Rafael Videla. He retired from competitions the same year.

Between 1975 and 1978 Jorritsma played 65 international matches and scored 1 goal.

Jorritsma was the national field hockey coach in 1987–1990 and 1991–1993. After that he headed the national teams of South Africa and Pakistan, and in 1996 was appointed as the manager of the Dutch association football team.

References

External links
 

1949 births
Living people
Dutch male field hockey players
Olympic field hockey players of the Netherlands
Field hockey players at the 1976 Summer Olympics
People from Lochem
1978 Men's Hockey World Cup players
Sportspeople from Gelderland
20th-century Dutch people